Wolfgang Amadeus Mozart's Piano Sonata No. 8 in A minor, K. 310 / 300d, was written in 1778. The sonata is the first of only two Mozart piano sonatas in a minor key (the other being No. 14 in C minor, K. 457). It was composed in the summer of 1778 around the time of his mother's death, one of the most tragic times of his life.

Background
Little is known about the precise circumstances surrounding the composition of the sonata; unlike the earlier Sonata in C major, K. 309/284b, it was little mentioned in his correspondence. The surviving manuscript was written using the same type of paper used for the Symphony No. 31 in D major, K. 297/300a, which Mozart purchased while in Paris.

The sonata is a rare minor key composition in Mozart's catalogue. Composed alongside the Violin Sonata No. 21 in E minor, K. 304/300c, it has been suggested that the sudden death of Mozart's mother may have led to the more sombre mood found in these pieces.

Structure

The composition, which typically takes around 22 minutes to perform, is in three movements:

References

Bibliography

Further reading

External links
 
 
  (Alte Mozart-Ausgabe version)
 

Piano Sonata 08
1778 compositions
Compositions in A minor